Gabriel Santos Cordeiro Lacerda (born 29 August 1999), known as Gabriel Lacerda, is a Brazilian professional footballer who plays as a central defender for Ceará.

Club career
Born in Caieiras, São Paulo, Gabriel Lacerda began his career with Palmeiras in 2013. He served a loan stint at Figueirense in 2017, and moved to Atlético Mineiro in September 2018; the move later collapsed after he suffered a knee injury.

On 30 May 2019, Gabriel Lacerda agreed to a contract with Ceará, as his link with Palmeiras was due to expire. Initially assigned to the under-20s, he made his professional debut on 13 August 2020, starting in a 1–1 Série A home draw with Grêmio.

Career statistics

Honours
Ceará
 Copa do Nordeste: 2020

References

External links
 Ceará official profile 

1999 births
Living people
People from Caieiras
Brazilian footballers
Association football defenders
Campeonato Brasileiro Série A players
Ceará Sporting Club players
Footballers from São Paulo (state)